Carter Lake is a lake located on Vancouver Island south of Schjelderup Lake and south east  of Golden Hinde in Strathcona Provincial Park.

References

Alberni Valley
Lakes of Vancouver Island
Nootka Land District